branches off the A 7 at Autobahndreieck Walsrode to the northwest, crossing A 1 at the Bremer Kreuz and continuing eastwards of Bremen, toward Cuxhaven. It also serves as European route E234, a B Class road on the International E-road network.

Due to the large ports (especially in Bremerhaven) alongside the Autobahn, there is heavy truck traffic.

Its northernmost part, between Bremen and Cuxhaven, largely replaced the Bundesstraße 6, although some maps still show the B 6 within the city limits of Bremerhaven.

Exit list 

 

 
 

|}

External links 
 UN Economic Commission for Europe: Overall Map of E-road Network (2007)

27
A027
A027